is a city located in Ōita Prefecture, Japan. The city was founded on March 31, 1954. On April 1, 2005, the towns of Kujū, Naoiri and Ogi (all from Naoiri District) were also merged into Taketa. As of March 31, 2017, the city has an estimated population of 22,661, with 10,393 households and a population density of 47 persons per km². The total area is 477.59 km².

Oka Castle is a famous local historic site.

Geography

Climate
Taketa has a humid subtropical climate (Köppen climate classification Cfa) with hot summers and cool winters. Precipitation is significant throughout the year, but is somewhat lower in winter.

Demographics
Per Japanese census data, the population of Taketa in 2020 is 20,332 people. Taketa has been conducting censuses since 1920.

Notable people from Taketa
Iwao Akiyama, former woodblock printmaker
Korechika Anami, former general in the Imperial Japanese Army during World War II
Kenji Anan, stage and film actor
Takeo Hirose, former career officer in the Imperial Japanese Navy
Otoya Kawano, Japanese voice actor

References

External links

  

Cities in Ōita Prefecture